Papaleo is a surname. Notable people with the surname include:

Carolina Papaleo (born 1969), Argentine actress
Joaquín Papaleo (born 1994), Argentine footballer
Joe Papaleo (born 1961), American soccer goalkeeper
Joseph Papaleo (1925–2004), Italian American novelist and academic 
Lawrence Papaleo (born 1989), American soccer coach and former player
Raúl Papaleo (born 1971), Puerto Rican beach volleyball player
Rocco Papaleo (born 1958), Italian actor, film director and singer